The men's 4 × 100 metre freestyle relay competition at the 1997 Pan Pacific Swimming Championships took place on August 12 at the NISHI Civic Pool.  The last champion was the United States.

This race consisted of eight lengths of the pool. Each of the four swimmers completed two lengths of the pool. The first swimmer had to touch the wall before the second could leave the starting block.

Records
Prior to this competition, the existing world and Pan Pacific records were as follows:

Results
All times are in minutes and seconds.

Heats
Heats weren't performed, as only five teams had entered.

Final 
The final was held on August 12.

References

4 × 100 metre freestyle relay
1997 Pan Pacific Swimming Championships